Muhammad Iqbal Choudhary ( born 11 September 1959) is a scientist in the field of organic chemistry from Pakistan. He is known for his research in various areas relating to natural product chemistry. He has more than 800 research publications. In 2015 he was recognised as the second most productive scientist in Pakistan.

Education and career
He graduated with BSc from Karachi University later pursued his MSc in organic chemistry and then got his PhD in organic chemistry H.E.J. Research Institute of Chemistry located at Karachi University with thesis titled as "The Isolation and Structural Studies on Some Medicinal Plants of Pakistan, Buxus papillosa, Catharanthus roseus, and Cissampelos pareira." He did his post-doctoral studies at Cornell University, United States.

Visiting faculty
Choudhary has been a visiting professor at these universities:
 Universiti Malaysia Pahang
 University of Rhode Island
 Universiti Teknologi MARA
 National University of Malaysia
 King Abdulaziz University
 King Saud University

Permanent faculty
Choudhary has worked at these institutions: 
 Professor at H.E.J. Research Institute of Chemistry & Dr Panjwani Centre for Molecular Medicine & Drug Research
 Professor Emeritus at University of Karachi
 Director International Center for Chemical and Biological Sciences

Prizes, honours and awards
Choudhary has been awarded the following recognitions for his contributions in the field of organic chemistry:

 Mustafa Prize in 2021 for discovery of fascinating molecules with therapeutic applications.
 Hilal-i-Imtiaz (Crescent of Excellence) Award by the President of Pakistan in 2007.
 Sitara-i-Imtiaz (Star of Excellence) Award by the President of Pakistan in 2001.
 Tamgha-i-Imtiaz (Medal of Excellence) Award by the Government of Pakistan in 1998.
 Distinguished National Professor of Higher Education Commission of Pakistan in 2004.
 COMSTECH Award in Chemistry in 2010
 TWAS Award (Third World Academy of Sciences Award), Young Scientist Award, Italy in 1994.
 Khwarizmi International Award by the President of Iran in 2006.
 Economic Cooperation Organization Award by the President of Azerbaijan in 2006.
 Senior Fulbright Award, United States, 1997-1998.
 Senior Fulbright Research Fellow, University of California in 1998.
 Gold medal of Pakistan Academy of Sciences in 1993.

Fellowships
 Fellow of Islamic World Academy of Sciences elected in 2002.
 Fellow of Pakistan Academy of Sciences elected in 2003.
 Fellow of Third World Academy of Sciences in 2003.

Publications
His major publications are as follows:
  New Cholinesterase-Inhibiting Steroidal Alkaloids from Sarcococca saligna.
  New α-Glucosidase Inhibitors from a Mongolian Medicinal Plant Ferula mongolica.
  Antibacterial Steroidal Alkaloids from Sarcococca saligna.
  Zoanthaminone, a new triterpenoidal alkaloid from marine Zoanthid.
  Five New Steroidal Alkaloids from Buxus papillosa, Some Relationships Between Structures and Specific Rotations.
  Solving Problems with Nuclear Magnetic Resonance Spectroscopy.
  Macroxine A Novel Oxindole Alkaloid from Alstonia macrophylla.
  New Cholinesterase Inhibiting Bisbenzlisoquinoline Alkaloids from Cocculus pendulus.
  Buxapapilinine A Novel Alkaloid from the Leaves of Buxus papillosa.
  Alkaloids from Rhazya stricta.
  Phenyl Polypropanoids from Lindelofia stylosa.
  Structure Elucidation and Antibacterial Activity of New Fungal Metabolites of Sclareol.
  Hydroxylation of the Sesterterpene Leucosceptrine by the Fungus Rhizopus stolonifer.

References

External links
Profile at Islamic World Academy of Sciences

1959 births
Living people
People from Karachi
University of Karachi alumni
Pakistani chemists
Recipients of Hilal-i-Imtiaz
Recipients of Sitara-i-Imtiaz
Recipients of Tamgha-e-Imtiaz
Fellows of Pakistan Academy of Sciences
Pakistani scientists
Cornell University alumni
Fellows of the Islamic World Academy of Sciences